Haematopota bigoti is a species of Horse-fly.

Distribution
It can be found in European countries as Austria, Croatia, Denmark, Hungary, Italy, Montenegro, Poland, Portugal, Romania, Slovakia, Spain, and the Netherlands.
From 1992-1993 it was recorded in Croatia, where it was captured feeding on cows and horses.

References

Tabanidae
Insects described in 1880
Taxa named by Émile Joseph Isidore Gobert
Diptera of Europe